The Internal Troops of Ukraine (– Interior Forces of Ukraine; Russian: Внутренние войска Украины, Vnutrenniye Voyska Ukrainy), abbreviated ВВ (VV), were a uniformed gendarmerie and Internal Troops in Ukraine which merged with the National Guard of Ukraine on March 13, 2014. They were subordinate to the Chief Directorate of Ministry of Internal Affairs (the country's civilian police authority), and cooperate with the State Emergency Service of Ukraine. The VV were used to assist militsiya in policing, deal with riots and internal armed conflicts, and safeguard important facilities such as nuclear power plants. In wartime, the Internal Troops were under the jurisdiction of the Ukrainian armed forces for local defense and rear area security.

The Internal Troops had similar personnel, bases, equipment, and traditions as the Soviet Internal Troops. Soviet VV units in the Ukrainian Soviet Socialist Republic during the dissolution of the Soviet Union were moved to the jurisdiction of newly independent Ukraine. However, Ukrainian VV troops were not a direct successor of the Soviet Internal Troops (unlike the Internal Troops of Russia) and their structure and tasks had been reformed. As of 2008, the Internal Troops of Ukraine numbered about 33,000. They were involved in the 2013-2014 Euromaidan revolution, defending the Presidential Administration Building in Kyiv.

The Verkhovna Rada of Ukraine issued a decree on 13 March 2014 which transferred the powers of the Internal Troops to the restored National Guard of Ukraine.

Tasks
The Internal Troops assist the militsiya in policing, crowd control, anti-riot operations, defending major facilities, guarding diplomatic missions, combating internal armed disturbances and terrorism (including some special forces tasks) and maintaining order during a state of emergency.

History

National Guard and Internal Troops 
The Internal Troops of Ukraine were formed on January 5, 1992 as part of the Ministry of Internal Affairs as the chief security directorate, and enacted by the Verkhovna Rada on March 26. Before that, all Soviet Internal Troops based in Ukraine were reorganized into the National Guard of Ukraine (initially as the Republican Guard) by a January 1991 decree. The troops later returned to their former tasks (and name), and the National Guard was disbanded.

Internal security during election unrest 
The Orange Revolution was a series of peaceful protests which overturned a presidential election during the winter of 2004–2005, resulting in the election of Viktor Yushchenko.
On November 28, 2004 over 10,000 Internal Troops mobilized to suppress protests on Independence Square in Kyiv by orders of their commander, Lt. Gen. Sergei Popkov. The SBU warned opposition leaders about the crackdown.

Oleksandr Galaka, head of the GUR, made calls to "prevent bloodshed". SBU chief Col. Gen. Ihor P. Smesko and military counterintelligence chief Maj. Gen. Vitaly Romanchenko warned Popkov to pull back his troops, and he complied. SBU senior officers claimed credit for averting a situation they said risked bloodshed and, possibly, civil war.

Reorganization attempts 

After a decade within the Ministry of Internal Affairs, the Internal Troops were reorganized. In May 2007, an ongoing political crisis led to a jurisdictional dispute over the troops. President Viktor Yushchenko issued a decree moving the Internal Troops from the Ministry of Internal Affairs to the jurisdiction of the President. On May 25, the Internal Troops loyal to the president marched to Kyiv. The Ministry of Internal Affairs criticized the decree and the troop movements.

Both sides avoided further clashes. The Internal Troops returned to their routine tasks, re-establishing coordination with the police, but the legal dispute over the troops remained unsolved. The Troops command was loyal to the president, in accordance with the decree appealed in court by the Cabinet of Ministers.

Organization
Although they reported to a civilian militsiya, the Internal Troops of Ukraine were a paramilitary force with a centralized system of ranks and service. The chief commander and staff of the Troops maintain a separate chain of command, and VV battalions and regiments were under the command of six territorial commanders (who report to the chief commander). The VV units were stationed on military bases throughout the country, including central Kyiv.

The Internal Troops had an aviation brigade, initially formed from the 51st Separate Helicopter Guard Regiment (Oleksandriia, Kirovohrad Oblast) and the 31st Special Helicopter Battle Squadron (Bila Tserkva). In 2000 the 51st Separate Helicopter Brigade was reinforced by an aviation squadron from the Yaguar special-operations unit, obtaining an additional airfield in Kalynivka, Vinnytsia Oblast.

Territorial divisions
There were six territorial commands, abbreviated TpK (EN:Trk): West, North, East, Center, South, and Crimea. Each TrK has units assigned to it, identified by a four-digit number.

Western TrK
 Lutsk (#1141)
 Lviv (#4114)
 Zolochiv, Lviv Oblast (#3080)
 Podillya (#3053) – Khmelnytskyi, Kamianets-Podilskyi
 Prykarpattya (#1241) – Chernivtsi, Ivano-Frankivsk, Kalush
 #3002 – Lviv, Ternopil, Rivne and Uzhhorod

Crimean TrK
 Simferopol (#3009), nicknanamed Lavanda (Lavender) - Mountain-rifle special-operations unit, initially a battalion but currently a company. Lavanda has a squadron (Skat) of military divers, and cooperates with Tin (Shadow) Company, an intelligence unit in Balaklava.
 Yevpatoria (#3055)
 Gaspra (#3058)
 Sevastopol (#4110)
 East Crimea (#4125) – Feodosia-13, Krasnokamianka, Sudak, Tyhr (Tiger) special-ops unit

Southern TrK
 Vinnytsia (#3008)
 Odesa (#3014)
 Odesa (#3012)
 Mykolaiv (#3039)
 Kherson (#3056)

Kyiv Northern TrK
 Vyshhorod Raion, Kyiv Oblast (#3027) – Nicknamed Bars (Snow leopard)
 Kyiv (#3030)
 Kyiv (#3066)
 Zhytomyr (#3047)
 Cherkasy (#3061)

Eastern TrK
 Donetsk (#2249)
 Donetsk (#3004)
 Donetsk (#3037)
 Kharkiv (#3005)
 Luhansk (#3035)
 Sumy (#3051)
 Mariupol, Donetsk Oblast (#3057)

Central TrK
 Central Ukraine (#3011) – Kryvyi Rih, Kirovohrad
 Zaporizhzhia Oblast (#3033) – Zaporizhzhia, Enerhodar, Melitopol, Berdiansk
 Zaporizhzhia (#3026)
 Dnipro (#3036)
 Dnipro (#3054)
 Poltava (#3052)
 Kremenchuk, Poltava Oblast (#3059)

Direct jurisdiction
 Kyiv (#2260)
 Kyiv (#3078)
 Kyiv (#3081)
 Vyshhorod Raion, Kyiv Oblast (#3077)
 Slavutych, Kyiv Oblast (#3041)
 Dnipro (#3021)
 Pavlohrad, Dnipropetrovsk Oblast (#3024)
 Zaporizhzhia (#2274)
 Zaporizhzhia (#3029), named as Hepard
 Enerhodar, Zaporizhzhia Oblast (#3042)
 Okhtyrka Raion, Sumy Oblast (#2276)
 Shostka, Sumy Oblast (#3022)
 Oleksandriia, Kirovohrad Oblast (#2269)
 Donetsk (#3023)
 Kalynivka, Vinnytsia Oblast (#3028) (nicknamed Yahuar)
 Netishyn, Khmelnytskyi Oblast (#3043)
 Yuzhnoukrainsk, Mykolaiv Oblast (#3044)
 Varash, Rivne Oblast (#3045)

Special units
In 1994, three regiments of special-assignment units were created to increase the Internal Troops' capability against organized crime. All were named for felidae: Bars (Snow Leopard, near Kyiv), Yahuar (Jaguar in Vinnytsia Oblast), and Hepard (Cheetah in Zaporizhzhia). On May 19, 2004, the 37th Separate Battalion of Internal Troops moved from Pavlohrad to Crimea, becoming the 47th Special-Assignment Regiment (later Tyhr, Tiger).

The Bars brigade, part of the Kyiv territorial command, includes a special-assignment Omega battalion (an anti-terrorist sniper unit). The Tyhr regiment is part of the Crimea territorial command; Yahuar and Hepard were company-sized regiments under the Chief Directorate of Internal Troops.

Other units

Kobra (Cobra) is a mountain-rifle special-ops battalion headquartered in Balaklava. Its present status is unclear. Skorpion, an anti-terrorist unit that maintains the security of nuclear facilities such as the Chernobyl AES, was originally part of the National Guard of Ukraine.

The 290th (Novorossiysk) Regiment was formed in April 1942 as part of the Soviet Internal Troops' mechanized infantry. During World War II, it defended the Georgian Military Road, participated in the liberation of Novorossiysk and maintained order in areas liberated from Nazi occupation. On November 24, 1945 the regiment was relocated to Kyiv, where until 1947 it fought gang violence in western Ukraine. In 1970 the regiment maintained order in Odesa during a cholera epidemic, and participated in security during the 1980 Summer Olympics.

In 1985, it maintained order at the Moscow World Youth Forum. From April 26, 1986, to May 1987 the regiment served in the aftermath of the Chernobyl disaster, maintaining order and preventing looting. From 1988 to 1991, it conducted a peacekeeping mission in the Caucasus. In 1992, the regiment joined the National Guard of Ukraine. After the disbanding of the National Guard in 2000, in accordance with a presidential decree it was transferred to the Armed Forces of Ukraine.

Personnel

The Internal Troops had gradually changed from the Soviet conscript system (similar to that for the Soviet Army) to the contract-personnel system. Conscription was ended by President Viktor Yanukovych in October 2013. VV officers were trained at the Internal Troops Academy.

Commanders
The Internal Troops have been commanded by:
 Lieutenant General Mykola Lytvyn: 2001 
 General of Army Oleksandr Kikhtenko: 2005–2010
 Lieutenant-General Serhiy Yarovyi: 2010–2014
 Lieutenant-General Serhiy Konoplyanyk: 2010–present (first deputy and commander of the VV in battle and special training)
 Lieutenant-General Stepan Poltorak: 2014

Weapons and equipment
Fort-12 9mm pistol
AK-74 5.45mm assault rifle
AKS-74U 5.45mm assault rifle
RPK 74 5.45mm machine gun
PKM 7.62mm machine gun

See also
European Gendarmerie Force
Novi Petrivtsi – Internal Troops training range, currently used to train National Guard of Ukraine recruits
National Police of Ukraine

Notes

External links

Official Website 
English page of the official Website (obsolete page content as of June 19, 2007)
Overview of MVS' special units 
List of special operations units
Official website of the National Guard of Ukraine

Defunct law enforcement agencies of Ukraine
Defunct gendarmeries
Euromaidan
Military of Ukraine
Military units and formations established in 1992
Military units and formations disestablished in 2014